Grant Hill  (born September 20, 1943) is a former Canadian Member of Parliament for the Conservative Party of Canada (2004), and a former member of the Canadian Alliance (2000–2004) and the Reform Party of Canada (1993–2000).

Life and career
From January to March 2004, Hill served as interim leader of the Official Opposition in the House of Commons. However, he was not the party's official interim leader—that role went to Senator John Lynch-Staunton.

Hill was first elected as a Member of Parliament (MP) for the Reform Party of Canada in the 1993 general election. He attracted controversy when he claimed, as a medical doctor, that homosexuality was an unhealthy lifestyle.  He was criticized by many other doctors, including fellow Reform (and later Liberal) MP Dr. Keith Martin.

He joined the Canadian Alliance when the Reform Party's successor was formed in 2000. In 2002, he was a candidate in the Canadian Alliance leadership election, placing fourth.

Hill has resumed his medical practice in Okotoks, Alberta. He is also well known for his collection of antique cars and his work in promoting car shows. He is married with a large family, and is a member of the Church of Jesus Christ of Latter-day Saints.

Hill did not run in the 2004 election.

Honours
On February 19, 2004 he was sworn in as a member of the Queen's Privy Council for Canada, giving him the right to use the prenominal title "The Honourable" and the post-nominal letters "PC" for life.

References

1943 births
Anglophone Quebec people
Canadian Alliance MPs
Canadian Latter Day Saints
Physicians from Alberta
Physicians from Montreal
Conservative Party of Canada MPs
Leaders of the Opposition (Canada)
Living people
Members of the House of Commons of Canada from Alberta
Members of the King's Privy Council for Canada
Politicians from Montreal
Reform Party of Canada MPs
21st-century Canadian politicians